David Bruce Ingram (born 1952) is an American philosopher and professor of philosophy at Loyola University Chicago. He is a recipient of Casa Guatemala's Human Rights Award (1999) and a recipient of the Alpha Sigma Nu Award for Best Book.
Ingram is married to the philosopher Jennifer Parks; she is from Kingston, Ontario, Canada. He has three children, the oldest named Sabina Simon (b. 1991, from a previous marriage), Maxwell (b. 2003) and the youngest named Samuel (b. 2005).

Books
 World Crisis and Underdevelopment: A Critical Theory of Poverty, Agency, and Coercion,Cambridge: Cambridge University Press, 2018.
 The Ethics of Development: Introduction, New York: Routledge, 2018.
 Habermas: Introduction and Analysis, Ithaca, NY: Cornell University Press, 2010
 The History of Continental Philosophy. Volume 5: Critical Theory to Structuralism: Philosophy, Politics, and the Human Sciences, New York: Routledge 2014.
 Group Rights: Reconciling Equality and Difference Lawrence, KS: University Press of Kansas, 2000
 Rights, Democracy, and Fulfillment in the Era of Identity Politics: Principled Compromises in a Compromised World Rowman and Littlefield, 2004.
 Reason, History and Politics: The Communitarian Grounds of Legitimation in the Modern Age Albany: State University of New York Press,
 Law: Key Concepts in Philosophy London: Continuum, London 2006.
 The Complete Idiot's Guide To Ethics Alpha Books, 2002.
 Habermas and the Dialectic of Reason New Haven Yale University Press, 1987. 263 pages.
 The Political: Readings In Continental Philosophy London: Blackwell, 2002.
 Critical Theory and Philosophy New York: Paragon House Publishers, 1990. 240 pages.
 Critical Theory: The Essential Readings New York: Paragon House Publishers, 1991. 388 pages.

References

21st-century American philosophers
Phenomenologists
Continental philosophers
Philosophy academics
Heidegger scholars
Living people
1952 births
Habermas scholars